Christina Milian is the debut studio album by American singer Christina Milian released internationally on October 9, 2001 by Murder Inc. Records and Def Soul, both divisions of Def Jam Recordings. Its American release was postponed due to the September 11 attacks, which occurred just weeks before its intended release date of September 25. Her label still opted to release it in Europe and later in Japan by early 2002, but the album was never officially released in North America. However, as of October 2020, the album has been made available on streaming services in the United States by Def Jam's sister label, Island Records. A deluxe edition of the album was also made available.

Milian made her first professional musical appearance on Ja Rule's single "Between Me and You", which led to a record deal with Def Soul in 2000. Milian traveled to Sweden where she collaborated with several producers, most notably Bloodshy & Avant, who helmed five tracks. Milian co-wrote eleven of the twelve songs on the album, taking inspiration from personal experiences. The album's musical style is mostly dance and R&B, and critics noted similarities to her contemporaries Britney Spears and Christina Aguilera. Milian was displeased by Def Soul's portrayal of her image, which she felt was constantly changing and confusing the audience.

The critical response to Christina Milian was mixed; critics who gave a positive review enjoyed the catchy tracks and lead single "AM to PM", while others found that it lacked original ideas. The album peaked at number 23 in the UK, selling a total of 101,986 copies, and achieved a Gold certification. Internationally, the album also charted in the Netherlands, Sweden and France. The album spawned two singles, "AM to PM" and "When You Look at Me", both of which became top-ten hits worldwide.

Production and composition 
Following her collaboration with Ja Rule, Milian signed a deal with Island Def Jam Music Group in 2000. Milian traveled to Sweden and recorded her self-titled debut album, working with the popular producers of that time. Milian collaborated with Bloodshy & Avant, Jermaine Dupri, Focus, Irv Gotti, Mark Hill, Montell Jordan and Evan Rogers. Soren Baker of the Los Angeles Times later suggested that instead of launching her career off the success of "Between Me and You", and by recording in Sweden without the "platinum production touch" of Irv Gotti, the owner of The Inc. Records, the momentum created by the song had evaporated. Milian received writing credit for eleven of the twelve songs on the album. It was during the production of the album that Milian had first started to write songs, and wrote about things that she could relate to at the time.

Milian described the sound of the album as "hip hop under-toned with nice, pop melodies", and later said the genre of the album was "bubble-gum pop". She described lead single "AM to PM" as a "very pop" and "fun, party/club song". The genre of the album was described by one critic as "light-hearted, energetic R&B pop tunes". Critics compared Milian to Janet Jackson and Aaliyah. Sonically, the album was said to stick "rigidly to the sherbert-snorting pop formula of Britney Spears and Christina Aguilera". One reviewer compared Milian to other singers of her generation, and found that "while Spears has gone raunchy with 'I Love Rock 'n' Roll', Christina Aguilera down and dirty on Stripped, and even clean-cut Mandy Moore has brashly cut her hair Felicity-style, Milian still seems young and real." The critic also compared Milian to Beyoncé Knowles, "while Beyonce is shaking her bootylicious body like crazy on 'Crazy In Love', Milian is simply enjoying becoming a young star."

Many live instruments were used during the album's production, especially violin. Milian named "You Make Me Laugh" one of her favorite songs on the album. It was the first song written by Milian for the album, and she worked with Bloodshy for the song's production. The album's second and final single, "When You Look at Me", was written by Milian. Using her school days as the inspiration for the song, Milian said that "when I was growing up, I found people were always trying to label me. The first day of school it would be like 'Here comes this girl all dressed up. She thinks she's all that' and they didn't even know me. The message behind 'When You Look At Me' is never judge a book by its cover." Milian asked Ja Rule to appear on her album, however she did not want to put him "on just any song", and wanted to make sure it was the right song for him. Milian hoped Ja Rule would appear on the track "A Girl Like Me", but he ended up rapping on "Get Away". Milian co-wrote the track "Twitch" with R&B singer Montell Jordan, which explains that men have a certain twitch of their shoulders whenever they tell lies.

Critical reception 

The album received mixed to positive reviews from music critics. Imran Ahmed of the New Musical Express enjoyed "genius single 'AM to PM'", and praised the tracks "Got to Have You" and "When You Look at Me". Ahmed guessed that "beneath the froth, there's a certain depth of soul" in Milian, and thought "Get Away" had similar excellent results to her previous collaboration with Ja Rule, "Between Me and You". The reviewer also commended the lyrics of "Twitch", which he thought was "remarkable for being what may be the first ever song about someone with a facial tic". Ahmed was impressed that alongside the impressive production credit list, it was "still Milian's name that tops the list of executive producers", and predicted, "genius can't be more than a few albums away". Contrastingly, Andrew Lynch of entertainment.ie described the album as "relentlessly ordinary", and suggested that Milian needed original ideas. The reviewer felt that apart from "AM to PM" and "You Make Me Laugh" there was nothing above the average. Lynch said that if Milian "really wants to compete with the big girls, she badly needs to spice up her tired formula."

A reviewer for Dawn commended the album for being "full of danceable, likeable tracks, and even the occasional, successful ballad like 'Until I Get Over You'". The reviewer called the album to be "a refreshing change with its charming lyrics and teen outlook". "AM to PM" was said to hint at "quite a lot of talent", and was praised for its "slick lyrics, a fast pace, and a phat vibe". The reviewer also praised "When You Look at Me", "Get Away", and "Got to Have You". Carmen Meyer of iafrica.com found the "smooth, groovy and refreshing" album to be filled "with light-hearted and catchy tracks, which can be enjoyed either in a club, your car or even when chilling at home." She commented on the album's tracks, which ranged from "melodic and heart-rending ballads to funky dance beats that are bound to keep you moving". Meyer praised the "infectious" "AM to PM", the "exciting" "A Girl Like Me", and "Till I Get Over You", which is "guaranteed to pull at your heartstrings and make you want to pull your loved ones closer".

Release and commercial performance 
The album was released on 21 January 2002 in the United Kingdom. It peaked at number 23 in the UK, selling a total of 101,986 copies, and achieved gold certification. Internationally, the album peaked at number 36 in the Netherlands, 98 in Sweden, and 138 in France. The release date in the US was scheduled for September 25, 2001, yet the September 11 attacks occurred and the release date was postponed, eventually released in the region on August 27, 2002. The album's lead single, "AM to PM", peaked at number three in the UK, the top five in Denmark, the top 10 in the Netherlands, and the top 30 in Australia and the US Billboard Hot 100. The album's second and final single, "When You Look at Me", reached number three in the UK and in the Netherlands, the top 10 in Australia, and the top 20 in Denmark and France. A music video for the track "Get Away" was filmed in Paris, although it was not officially released as a single. To promote the album, Milian toured with NSYNC, serving as the opening act. Band member JC Chasez said, "she was like the cute, spunky kid sister. Not everyone could take Justin's practical jokes or my teasing."

Milian believed that the public expected "a certain thing" from her when she first appeared with Ja Rule, however she wanted to record the type of music she was signed to do. She said that "AM to PM" was a "cool record", but it was not what the public expected. Milian felt that her record label was confused as to how they wanted her image to be portrayed; one second she was young and singing "AM to PM", and next she was a grown woman singing "Get Away". She realized that the change confused the audience, and that "nobody was buying it". To explain that she was serious about her musical career, Milian approached the executives at Island Def Jam, and "cussed them all out", telling them that they were not listening to her.

Track listing 

Notes
 denotes co-producer

Personnel 

 Executive producers – Christina Milian, Jeff Fenster, Carmen Milian
 Vocal assistance – Montell Jordan, Jeanette Olsson, Christina Milian
 Vocal arrangements – Christina Milian, Bloodshy, Avant, Focus, Montell Jordan
 Engineers – Joe Chiccarelli, Brian Frye, Al Hemberger, Glenn Matullo, Carlisle Young
 Assistant engineers – Tom Bender, Stephanie Vonarx
 Conductors – Janson & Janson
 Mixing – Mick Guzauski, Tony Maserati, Peter Mokran, Brian Springer, Phil Tan
 A&R – Hector "Rick Boogie" Aviles, Simon Collins, Jeff Fenster
 Design – Shanna Busman
 Art direction – Shanna Busman
 Photography – Tony Duran

 Bass – LaMarquis Mark Jefferson, Thomas Lindberg
 Cello – Asa Forsberg
 Guitar – Henrik Jonback 
 Viola – Hans Akeson, Elisabeth Arnberg Ranmo, Monika Stanikowska
 Violin – Dag Alin, Torbjorn Bernhardsson, Hanna Gähran, Per Hammarstrom, Annette Mannheimer, Svein H. Martinsen, Martin Stensson

Charts

Weekly charts

Year-end charts

Certifications

References

2001 debut albums
Albums produced by Carl Sturken and Evan Rogers
Albums produced by Bryan-Michael Cox
Albums produced by Bloodshy & Avant
Albums produced by Irv Gotti
Albums produced by Jermaine Dupri
Albums produced by Focus...
Albums with cover art by Tony Duran
Christina Milian albums